Patrik Rybár (born 9 November 1993) is a Slovak professional ice hockey goaltender for HC Spartak Moscow in the Kontinental Hockey League (KHL).

Playing career
Rybár began his professional career for HC Slovan Bratislava of the Slovak Extraliga during the 2010–11 season, appearing in one game.

He has split his last four professional seasons between Slovakia and the Czech Republic, totaling a 47–26 record, 1.93 goals-against average (GAA), .927 save percentage, and nine shutouts in two seasons with Mountfield HK from 2016 to 2018, and posting a 3.07 GAA and .920 save percentage with ŠHK 37 Piešťany in the Slovakian Extraliga from 2014 to 2016, including the Slovak Extraliga's top save percentage (.933) in 2015–16.

During the 2017–18 season, he posted a 23–13 record for Mountfield HK and led the league in both GAA (1.73) and shutouts (7), alongside a .932 save percentage. He helped his club reach the semifinals in the Extraliga playoffs, posting a 2.24 GAA and .918 save percentage in 12 playoff games.

On 21 May 2018, Rybár signed a one-year, entry-level contract with Detroit Red Wings of the National Hockey League. In the 2018–19 season, after participating in the Red Wings training camp Rybár was assigned to play exclusively with American Hockey League affiliate, the Grand Rapids Griffins. He collected 16 wins in 37 appearances with the Griffins.

At the conclusion of his contract, Rybár was tendered a qualifying offer by the Red Wings; however, he opted to return to Europe in agreeing to a one-year contract with Oulun Kärpät of the Finnish Liiga on 1 July 2019.

Leaving Finland after two seasons with Kärpät, Rybár was signed to a one-year contract with Belarusian-based club, HC Dinamo Minsk of the KHL, on 6 May 2021.

In the following season, Rybár would continue in the KHL, joining HC Spartak Moscow on a one-year contract on 23 June 2022.

International play

Rybár was named to the Slovakian Olympic team at the 2018 Winter Olympics but did not see game action. He also represented Slovakia at the 2018 IIHF World Championship, appearing in three games with a 1–1 record, 2.49 GAA, and .906 save percentage.

Personal life
He is the son of former hockey player Pavol Rybár.

References

External links
 

1993 births
Living people
HC Dinamo Minsk players
Grand Rapids Griffins players
Ice hockey players at the 2018 Winter Olympics
Ice hockey players at the 2022 Winter Olympics
Medalists at the 2022 Winter Olympics
Olympic bronze medalists for Slovakia
Olympic medalists in ice hockey
Oulun Kärpät players
Slovak ice hockey goaltenders
HC Slovan Bratislava players
ŠHK 37 Piešťany players
HC Spartak Moscow players
Stadion Hradec Králové players
HC Stadion Litoměřice players
Olympic ice hockey players of Slovakia
Sportspeople from Skalica
HK Trnava players
HK 95 Panthers Považská Bystrica players
HK 91 Senica players
Slovak expatriate ice hockey players in the Czech Republic
Slovak expatriate ice hockey players in the United States
Slovak expatriate ice hockey players in Russia
Slovak expatriate ice hockey players in Finland
Slovak expatriate sportspeople in Belarus
Expatriate ice hockey players in Belarus